The epiglottal or pharyngeal plosive (or stop) is a type of consonantal sound, used in some spoken languages.

Epiglottal and pharyngeal consonants occur at the same place of articulation. Esling (2010) describes the sound covered by the term "epiglottal plosive" as an "active closure by the aryepiglottic pharyngeal stricture mechanism" – that is, a stop produced by the aryepiglottic folds within the pharynx.

Features

Features of the epiglottal stop:

It has no defined phonation, although it is typically voiceless, which means it is produced without vibrations of the vocal cords. Voiced epiglottal "stops" tend toward being epiglottal flaps.

Occurrence

See also
 Index of phonetics articles

Notes

References

External links
 

Plosives
Pulmonic consonants
Oral consonants